Arazi Tari is a village in Pindra Tehsil of Varanasi district in the Indian state of Uttar Pradesh. Arazi Tari falls under Sarvipur gram panchayat. The village is about 40 kilometers North-West of Varanasi city, 274 kilometers South-East of state capital Lucknow and 789 kilometers South-East of the national capital Delhi.

Demography
Arazi Tari has a total population of 78 people amongst 9 families. Sex ratio of Arazi Tari is 696 and child sex ratio is 444. Uttar Pradesh state average for both ratios is 912 and 902 respectively .

Transportation
Arazi Tari can be accessed by road and does not have a railway station of its own. Closest railway station to this village is Babatpur railway station (18.5 kilometers East). Nearest operational airports are Varanasi airport (18 kilometers East) and Allahabad Airports (127 kilometers West).

See also

Pindra Tehsil
Pindra (Assembly constituency)

Notes
  All demographic data is based on 2011 Census of India.

References 

Villages in Varanasi district